Hippuris, the mare's tail, was previously the sole genus in the family Hippuridaceae. Following genetic research by the Angiosperm Phylogeny Group, it has now been transferred to the family Plantaginaceae, with Hippuridaceae being reduced to a synonym of Plantaginaceae.

It includes one to three species depending on taxonomic interpretation. Some authorities only accept the first species of those listed below, treating the other two as synonyms of it:

Common mare's tail, Hippuris vulgaris
Mountain mare's tail, Hippuris montana
Fourleaf mare's tail, Hippuris tetraphylla

They are aquatic plants found in shallow ponds and streams, both slow-moving and fast-flowing. Hippuris, despite being a flowering plant, is sometimes mistakenly identified with the non-flowering plant horsetail.

References

External links  
  Distribution map, description, and picture of H. vulgaris
  Description and picture of H. vulgaris
 Hippuridaceae of Mongolia in FloraGREIF

Plantaginaceae
Plantaginaceae genera